Silver Sail is the seventh studio album by punk rock band Wipers, released in 1993. After disbanding Wipers in 1989 and releasing a 1991 solo album, Sacrifice (For Love),  Sage decided to release a new album under the Wipers name.

Production
The album was written, produced and recorded by Sage at his Zeno Studios in Phoenix, Arizona. Steve Plouf returned to play drums.

Critical reception
Trouser Press wrote: "A more deliberate pace allows Sage’s virtuoso playing extra opportunity to bob and weave, float and tickle, tease and torment; he introduces hints of quiet surf music, spaghetti westerns and other lonely, timeless sounds." The Rough Guide to Rock deemed the album "a return to The Circle'''s jazzy style of neo-psychedelic thrash." Rolling Stone'' wrote that Sage emphasizes "deep-pool echo and a punky, rainy-day melancholy that gives new meaning to the term power ballad."

Track listing
All songs written by Greg Sage.

 "Y I Came" - 2:40
 "Back to the Basics" - 3:39
 "Warning" - 4:05
 "Mars" - 2:35
 "Prisoner" - 5:56
 "Standing There" - 3:13
 "Sign of the Times" - 3:16
 "Line" - 3:15
 "On a Roll" - 3:22
 "Never Win" - 2:16
 "Silver Sail" - 4:05

References

1993 albums
Wipers albums